Yevgeny Kafelnikov was the defending champion but lost in the semifinals to Marc Rosset.

Goran Ivanišević won in the final 6–3, 7–6(7–3) against Rosset.

Seeds
A champion seed is indicated in bold text while text in italics indicates the round in which that seed was eliminated.

  Thomas Muster (first round)
  Boris Becker (first round)
  Yevgeny Kafelnikov (semifinals)
  Goran Ivanišević (champion)
  Sergi Bruguera (first round)
  Richard Krajicek (second round)
  Michael Stich (second round)
  Marc Rosset (final)

Draw

External links
 1996 Italian Indoor draw

Milan Indoor
1996 ATP Tour
Milan